Sontag is a surname. Notable people with the surname include:

 Alan Sontag (born 1946), American bridge player and author
 Andrzej Sontag (born 1952), Polish triple jumper
 Brett Sontag (born 1970), American racecar driver
 Eduardo Daniel Sontag (born 1951), American/Argentine mathematician
 Frank Sontag (born 1955), American talk radio show host
 Frederick Sontag (1924–2009) American author and educator
 George Contant Sontag (1864–unknown), American outlaw
 Henriette Sontag (1806–1854), German operatic soprano
 John Sontag (1861–1893, American outlaw
 Susan Sontag (1933–2004), American essayist, novelist, filmmaker, and activist
 Tiga Sontag (born 1974), Canadian DJ/producer
 Tony Sontag, English darts player

See also
 Sontag, Mississippi, community in north west Lawrence County, Mississippi
 
 Sonntag (disambiguation)

Surnames from nicknames